Athanasius the Athonite (c. 920 – c. 1003), was a Byzantine monk who is considered the founder of the monastic community on the peninsula of Mount Athos; which has since evolved into the greatest centre of Eastern Orthodox monasticism.

Biography
His parents were from Antioch. He was born in Trebizond and patronized by Michael Maleinos, he studied at Constantinople and became famous there as Abraham, a fervent preacher who held great authority with Michael's nephew, Nicephoros Phocas. By the time Phocas ascended the imperial throne, Abraham, ill at ease with the lax morals of the monks living in the capital, changed his name to Athanasios and joined the monks at Mount Kyminas in Bithynia. In 958, he relocated to Mount Athos.

He helped defend the hermits, or sketes, there against the Saracens, and also started to incorporate the sketes already there into what would eventually become known as the Great Lavra, which Athanasios built with the financial assistance of Nicephoros. This monastery was dedicated in 963. It is still in use today, and is often referred to by people of the area simply as "Lavra", or "The Monastery". Three other foundations followed shortly thereafter, with all three of them remaining in place to the present. Athanasios met with considerable opposition from the hermits already at Mount Athos in the construction of his monasteries. They resented his intrusion and his attempts to bring order and discipline to their lives.

Upon Nicephoros' death the enemies of Athanasios prevailed and he had to leave Athos for Cyprus, where he lived until the new emperor, John Tzimisces, resumed the patronage of the Great Lavra and bestowed upon the monastery its first charter in 972. This charter, which is kept at the Protaton in Karyes today, is also known as the Tragos ('goat'), since it was written on goatskin parchment. Athanasios, spurred by a divine vision, returned at once to Athos as a hegumen (abbot) and introduced a typicon for cenobites, based on those compiled by Theodore Studites and Basil of Caesarea.

He died during an accident, killed by a falling masonry, when the cupola of his church collapsed. Upon his death, Athanasios was glorified as a saint. His feast day is 5 July.

Sites
The  is a historic bridge located about 5–6 km from the main compound of the Great Lavra. Its construction is traditionally attributed to Athanasius the Athonite.

References

Attwater, Donald and Catherine Rachel John. The Penguin Dictionary of Saints. 3rd edition. New York: Penguin Books, 1993. .

External links 
Life of St. Athanasios of Athos

920s births
1000s deaths
Athonite Fathers
Byzantine theologians
Byzantine Pontians
Greek Christian monks
Saints of medieval Greece
Medieval Athos
People from Trapezus
10th-century Byzantine monks
11th-century Christian saints
Founders of Christian monasteries
11th-century Christian monks
10th-century Byzantine writers
11th-century Christian theologians
People associated with Great Lavra